Das Veilchen vom Montmartre (The Violet of Montmartre) is an operetta in 3 acts by Hungarian composer Emmerich Kálmán. The libretto was written by Julius Brammer and Alfred Grünwald.

Roles

References

External links
 Work details, 
 Clips from a performance at the "Moscow Operetta Theatre"

Operas by Emmerich Kálmán
German-language operettas
1930 operas
Operas set in Paris
Operas
Montmartre